Beausejour is a town in the Canadian province of Manitoba.  It is 46 kilometres northeast of Winnipeg, just west of the Canadian Shield and Whiteshell Provincial Park.  The French name  means "beautiful stay".  The town is surrounded by the Rural Municipality of Brokenhead. Originally known as Stony Prairie, Beausejour was named in 1877 by Mrs H.W.D. Armstrong, wife of a government railway surveyor, when a telegraph office was installed there to serve settlers along the nearby Brokenhead River.

History
In 1906, the "Manitoba Glass Works" was founded, in a town now known as Beausejour, by Joseph Keilback and his partners.  Sustained by a nearby deposit of high quality sand, it was the first glass container factory in Western Canada.  Glassblowers from Poland and the United States, supported by local labour, used silica sands to produce bottles for breweries and soft drink companies in Winnipeg. In 1909 it was taken over by a Winnipeg businessman, who expanded production to include jars, medicine bottles, and ink bottles. At its peak, the Manitoba Glass Works employed 350 workers, but because of its inability to compete with Eastern Canadian manufacturers, was purchased in 1913 by a Montreal company and relocated to Redcliff, Alberta. The factory site remains, and was designated as a Provincial Heritage Site (number 41) on 27 September 1989.

In 1912, the Town of Beausejour was incorporated.

It is the birthplace of former Provincial Premier and Governor General Edward Schreyer. Edward Schreyer School is named after him in his honour.

Beausejour was the setting for the 1990 film The Outside Chance of Maximilian Glick, & its 1990-91 television dramedy series adaptation, Max Glick. The film was largely filmed there.

Demographics 

Access
Major highways servicing Beausejour are PTH 44 and PTH 12, which run concurrently north of town.  From the south, Beausejour can be reached by traveling PTH 12 and Provincial Road 215 east into town or by taking PR 302.  PTH 44, PR 215, and PR 302 intersect at the west side of town.

Prior to the construction of the Trans-Canada Highway, PTH 44 was the main route from Winnipeg to the Ontario border.

Economy
Beausejour's current economy is based on agriculture (grain production) and tourism. Its location as a main access point to the Whiteshell Provincial Park, a popular cottage region and tourist attraction, allows Beausejour to cater to visitor traffic through the area.  It also serves as the main commercial centre for farmers and residents of the surrounding areas.

Notable people
Raquel Dancho, politician
Bob Davie, former NHL defenceman
Monika Deol, TV host
Peter Engbrecht, WWII pilot
Jason Gunnlaugson, curler
Fred Klym, politician
Mark Koenker, politician
Hayley Marie Kohle, model
Edward Schreyer, former Premier of Manitoba and Governor general of Canada
John Mouat Turner, politician
Anton Weselak, politician

Recreation
The town is home to the Canadian Power Toboggan Championships, the Double B Agricultural Festival (formerly Double B Rodeo and Country Fair) and the annual Brokenhead River Agricultural Conference. Beausejour is also known for its annual "Shades of the Past" car show on the last Sunday of August. The car show encompasses all of Park Avenue and attracts over 500 classic and special interest vehicles.

Beausejour has also hosted the 2011 Manitoba provincial men's curling championship (then known as the Safeway Championship) won by Jeff Stoughton (Charleswood), and two Manitoba provincial women's curling championships, Scott Tournament of Hearts, at the Sun Gro Centre. The 2004 Manitoba Scott Tournament of Hearts was won by Lois Fowler (Brandon, Wheat City Curling Club), while the 2016 Scotties Tournament of Hearts was won by Kerri Einarson (East St. Paul Curling Club), with Beausejour's Selena Kaatz playing third.

Sports

Beausejour hosted the 2006 Power Smart Manitoba Games. The opening ceremonies were held at the CPTC Racetrack, and the closing ceremonies at the Sun Gro Centre.

Beausejour's hockey teams are known as the Blades. Beausejour's CRJHL team is the Beausejour Comets. The Eastman Selects of the Manitoba Midget 'AAA' Hockey League plays in the town. Hockey games are played in the Sun Gro Centre, which also has a curling rink.

Media
The Beausejour Review published its final issue on 27 June 2013.

There are two local weekly community newspapers serving the Beausejour and Brokenhead area.
 
The Clipper Weekly and The Lac du Bonnet Clipper. 
The Clipper Publishing Corp.

Town Radio Beausejour broadcasts to Beausejour and the surrounding area as CKBJ-FM at 93.9 on the FM dial.

Climate
Beausejour has a humid continental climate influenced by its far inland position in the higher mid-latitudes, resulting in warm and occasionally hot summers and frequently severely cold winters, with January average highs being below .

References

External links 

Official Town of Beausejour Website
 https://www.thecanadianencyclopedia.ca/en/article/beausejour#:~:text=Originally%20known%20as%20Stony%20Prairie,along%20the%20nearby%20Brokenhead%20River.

Towns in Manitoba
Urban municipalities in Eastman Region, Manitoba